Music From The Motion Picture "Higher Learning" is the soundtrack to John Singleton's 1995 film Higher Learning. It was released on January 3, 1995 on Singleton's label New Deal Music through 550 Music/Epic Soundtrax and contained a mixture of different music genres including hip hop, R&B and rock music. The soundtrack did fairly well on the Billboard charts, peaking at #39 on the Billboard 200 and #9 on the Top R&B/Hip-Hop Albums.

Liz Phair was nominated for Grammy Award for Best Female Rock Vocal Performance at the 37th Annual Grammy Awards for her song "Don't Have Time".

All the recordings were initially exclusive to the soundtrack. Two charting singles were included on the soundtrack, Raphael Saadiq's "Ask of You", which peaked at #19 on the Billboard Hot 100 and #2 on the Hot R&B/Hip-Hop Singles & Tracks, and Mista Grimm's "Situation: Grimm", which made it to #97 on the Hot R&B/Hip-Hop Singles & Tracks. The Rage Against the Machine track was later re-recorded for their album Evil Empire.

Track listing

Charts

References

External links

1995 soundtrack albums
Hip hop soundtracks
Epic Records soundtracks
Alternative rock soundtracks
Contemporary R&B soundtracks
Albums produced by Brad Wood
Albums produced by Eric Rosse
Albums produced by Ted Niceley
Albums produced by David Gamson
Albums produced by Raphael Saadiq
Albums produced by Stanley Clarke
Albums produced by Organized Noize
Albums produced by Brendan O'Brien (record producer)
Drama film soundtracks